Tympaki is a town and a former municipality in the Heraklion regional unit, Crete, Greece.

The town is located on the south coast, between Agia Galini and Matala, and has a population of about 5,700 people (10,000 for the municipal unit). In 2005, a major container harbour and free-trade zone had been rumored to be built in the area. As of January 2009, it appears the project has been canceled, in part due to the strong opposition from the local population.

Climate

References

Messara Plain
Populated places in Heraklion (regional unit)